Arlon-Marche-en-Famenne-Bastogne-Neufchâteau-Virton is a parliamentary constituency in Belgium used to elect members of the Parliament of Wallonia from 2019. It corresponds to the province of Luxembourg. It was created from the former constituencies of Arlon-Marche-Bastogne and Neufchâteau-Virton and was first contested for the 2019 Belgian regional elections.

Representatives

See also
 Arrondissement of Arlon
 Arrondissement of Marche-en-Famenne
 Arrondissement of Bastogne
 Arrondissement of Neufchâteau (Belgium)
 Arrondissement of Virton

References

Constituencies of the Parliament of Wallonia